Paulo Daniel Dentello Azzi (born 15 July 1994) is a Brazilian professional footballer who plays as a left-back or a winger for Italian  club Cagliari.

Career
Born in Bragança Paulista, Azzi joined Paulista's youth setup in 2008, aged 13. In July 2013 he was promoted to the first-team ahead of that year's Copa Paulista. He also appeared three times in the competition, all from the bench.

On 31 January 2014, Azzi joined Italian Serie B side A.S. Cittadella. On 15 March he made his professional debut, starting and assisting Juan Surraco in the winner against Carpi at Pier Cesare Tombolato; seven days later he scored his first professional goal, netting his side's second of a 4–0 routing at Padova.

On 11 July 2020, he moved to Serie D club Seregno.

On 1 February 2021, he returned to Serie C and signed with Lecco.

On 3 July 2021, Azzi signed a two-year contract with fellow Serie C side Modena. He made his debut on 6 September in a 1–1 league draw against Reggiana as a late substitute for Alessandro Marotta. On 31 October, he scored his first goal for the club in the injury time of a 2–0 home win over Carrarese. The Brazilian eventually contributed to Modena's direct promotion to Serie B after six years.

After spending the first half of the 2022–23 season as a regular starter at Modena, on 12 January 2023 Azzi officially joined fellow Serie B club Cagliari for an undisclosed fee, signing a contract until June 2025, with an option for another year. He subsequently made his debut two days later, starting and scoring a goal in a 2–0 league win against Como.

References

External links
 

1994 births
Living people
Footballers from São Paulo (state)
Brazilian footballers
Association football forwards
Paulista Futebol Clube players
Tombense Futebol Clube players
Serie B players
Serie C players
Serie D players
A.S. Cittadella players
Spezia Calcio players
F.C. Pavia players
Pordenone Calcio players
Siracusa Calcio players
A.S. Bisceglie Calcio 1913 players
F.C. Pro Vercelli 1892 players
U.S. 1913 Seregno Calcio players
Calcio Lecco 1912 players
Modena F.C. players
Cagliari Calcio players
Brazilian expatriate footballers
Brazilian expatriate sportspeople in Italy
Expatriate footballers in Italy
People from Bragança Paulista